Promise in the History is the sixth studio album by Japanese singer/songwriter Mari Hamada, released on September 5, 1986, by Invitation. The album was reissued alongside Hamada's past releases on January 15, 2014.

Track listing

Personnel 
 Tak Matsumoto – guitar
 Takayuki Hijikata – guitar
 Yoshihiro Naruse – bass
 Naoki Watanabe – bass
 Yoshinobu Kojima – keyboards
 Takanobu Masuda – keyboards
 Atsuo Okamoto – drums

References

External links 
  (Mari Hamada)
  (Victor Entertainment)
 
 

1986 albums
Japanese-language albums
Mari Hamada albums
Victor Entertainment albums